Peter Crosby is the current Archdeacon of Ottawa.

References

Year of birth missing (living people)
Place of birth missing (living people)
Living people
University of Toronto alumni
Archdeacons of Ottawa
21st-century Anglican priests